Eva Tinschmann (April 19, 1893 – August 10, 1978) was a German actress. She appeared in the 1937 Sherlock Holmes film The Grey Lady.

Selected filmography
 The Final Chord (1936)
 The Accusing Song (1936)
 Scandal at the Fledermaus (1936)
 Truxa (1937)
 Capers (1937)
 The Divine Jetta (1937)
 His Best Friend (1937)
 The Grey Lady (1937)
 After Midnight (1938)
 The Stars Shine (1938)
 Robert and Bertram (1939)
 Wibbel the Tailor (1939)
 Twelve Minutes After Midnight (1939)
 My Aunt, Your Aunt (1939)
 The Girl at the Reception (1940)
 My Daughter Doesn't Do That (1940)
 Venus on Trial (1941)
 The Gasman (1941)
 Above All Else in the World (1941)
 The Little Residence (1942)
 The Second Shot (1943)
 Back Then (1943)
 Ghost in the Castle (1947)

References

Bibliography 
 Pointer, Michael. The Sherlock Holmes File. David & Charles, 1976.

External links 
 

1893 births
1978 deaths
German stage actresses
German film actresses
Actors from Königsberg
20th-century German actresses